The discography of English rock band Beady Eye consists of two studio albums, one extended play, eleven singles and ten music videos. Formed in 2009, as one of two bands formed following the split of Oasis in 2009. The other is Noel Gallagher's High Flying Birds.
The band consists of vocalist Liam Gallagher, guitarists Gem Archer and Andy Bell, bassist Jay Mehler and drummer Chris Sharrock – with the exception of Mehler, all had previously been involved with the English rock band Oasis.

Their debut single "Bring the Light" was released in November 2010, peaking at number 61 in the United Kingdom and at number 82 in the Belgian region of Flanders. "The Roller" was their first UK top forty hit, peaking at number 31 – it also became a top ten hit in Japan. Different Gear, Still Speeding, Beady Eye's debut studio album, was released in February 2011. It peaked at number three in the United Kingdom and was later certified gold by the British Phonographic Industry. The album produced three additional singles: "Four Letter Word", "Millionaire" and "The Beat Goes On".

Beady Eye's second studio album BE was released in June 2013 and entered the UK albums chart at number 2, 1 place higher than their previous effort. It was preceded by the release of the single "Second Bite of the Apple", which peaked at number 112 in the UK, a commercial failure compared with the singles from Different Gear, Still Speeding. The second  single from BE, the double A-side "Shine a Light" / "The World's Not Set in Stone", was released on 18 August 2013. The last single from the album, again the double A-side, "Iz Rite" / "Soul Love" was released on 25 November 2013.

Albums

Studio albums

Extended plays

Singles

Other charted songs

Boxsets

Music videos

References

External links
 
 Beady Eye at Allmusic
 
 

Discographies of British artists
Rock music group discographies